The Natural Reserve on the banks of Castronuño-Vega del Duero is a nature reserve situated in the western part of the province of Valladolid, autonomous community of Castile and Leon, Spain. This is the only natural area protected in this province. Also it is known as the Gran Florida del Duero (the Great Florida of the Douro) .

Is located in an area of moorland and sedimented banks. Therefore, this is an area of nesting and migratory water birds. The Duero is surrounded by forests of Ribera and constitutes a very interesting swamp ecosystem. It is an area of great plains and absence of high elevations

History 
In the 1940s a dam was constructed across the Douro River as part of a hydroelectric plant. Upstream, in the municipal district of Castronuño, was created the reservoir of San Jose, which was what brought about the formation of this reserve, which constitutes a unique ecosystem with biotic elements and landscape.

Many sediments were flooded and changed the riverbank to fertile fields, which were gradually colonized by large masses of the reedbed, maintained by the constant level of the reservoir. The greater growing mass of the reedbed attracted more birds attracted to the habitat of the wetlands. It is a semi-natural wetland.

The nature reserve was considered a Special Protection Area for Birds in 1992 and Strict Nature Reserve in 2002.

References

External links
 Nature Reserve Banks of Castronuño
 Reserve of Castronuño
 Casa de la Reserva Natural de las Riberas de Castronuño-Vega del Duero en Fundación de Patrimonio Natural de Castilla y León 
 Reserva natural de las Riberas de Castronuño 
 http://www.jcyl.es/web/jcyl/MedioAmbiente/es/Plantilla100/1131977545522/_/_/_ 
 http://www.jcyl.es/web/jcyl/MedioAmbiente/es/Plantilla100/1228832065868/_/_/_ 
 http://www.patrimonionatural.org/ren.php?espacio_id=31 
 http://www.patrimonionatural.org/casas.php?id_casa=16 
 http://www.turismocastillayleon.com/cm/turcyl/tkContent?idContent=1305&textOnly=false&locale=es_ES 
 http://www.magrama.gob.es/es/desarrollo-rural/temas/caminos-naturales/caminos-naturales/sector-noroeste/duero/etapa17/duero_etapa17.aspx 
 http://www.magrama.gob.es/es/desarrollo-rural/temas/caminos-naturales/caminos-naturales/sector-noroeste/duero/etapa17/galeria_duero_etapa17.aspx 

Province of Valladolid
Birdwatching sites in Spain
Protected areas of Castile and León
Special Protection Areas of Spain
Nature reserves in Spain
Protected areas established in 2002
2002 establishments in Spain